Nei Lak Shan (Chinese: 彌勒山) is the eighth highest mountain in Hong Kong.

An angle station of the Ngong Ping 360 cable car is located near Nei Lak Shan.

Name 
The Cantonese name Nei Lak Shan, or prescriptively Mei Lak Shan (Chinese: 彌勒山; Jyutping: Mei4 Lak6 Saan1) is a translation of Maitreya, the future Buddha, in Buddhism. The mountain can therefore be loosely translated as "Buddha Mountain". It is situated close to the Tian Tan Buddha at Ngong Ping.

See also 

 List of mountains, peaks and hills in Hong Kong

References 

Mountains, peaks and hills of Hong Kong
Ngong Ping